Allen George Mitchell (May 5, 1894 – February 23, 1953) served in the California State Assembly for the 68th district from 1923 to 1925. During World War I he served in the United States Army.

References

External links
Join California Allen G. Mitchell

United States Army personnel of World War I
Republican Party members of the California State Assembly
20th-century American politicians
1894 births
1952 deaths
People from Montesano, Washington